Piața Constituției (Romanian for "Constitution Square") is one of the largest squares in the centre of Bucharest, Romania. The square is standing face-to-face with the Palace of the Parliament (biggest building in Europe) and it is bisected by Bulevardul Unirii (Union Boulevard) and by Bulevardul Libertății (Liberty Boulevard). 

The square is one of the best places to organize concerts and parades of Bucharest. Every year, the mayor of Bucharest organizes the New Year's Party in this square. The square is also used to host military parades in honor of the National Day of Romania.

Concerts

References

Squares in Bucharest
National squares
Music venues in Romania